The 2012 BYU Cougars football team represented Brigham Young University in the 2012 NCAA Division I FBS football season. The Cougars, led by head coach Bronco Mendenhall, played their home games at LaVell Edwards Stadium. This was the second year BYU competed as an independent. They finished the season 8–5. They were invited to the Poinsettia Bowl where they defeated San Diego State.

Before the season

2012 Recruits
As the home of the Cougars, BYUtv would sponsor their own National Letter of Intent Day signing day special. The special aired on Wednesday, February 1 at 7 PM MT and was rebroadcast that night at 10 PM MT and Thursday morning at 1 AM MT. Additionally a signing day press conference was broadcast on BYUtvsports.com live at 1:30 PM MT. The following athletes signed letters of intent to play for BYU in the coming seasons.

6 of the Cougar commitments (Amone, Hannemann, Hinds, Mangum, Richards, and Weeks) plan to serve full-time church missions for the Church of Jesus Christ of Latter-day Saints before joining the BYU team. 3 Cougars commitments (Hill, Johnson, and Olsen) were mid-year enrollees. Powell graduated High School in winter 2011 and was already taking classes at BYU, so there was no letter of intent for him to sign. He plans to grey-shirt before going on a church mission. With 6 other QB's on the roster, Mangum also chose to grey-shirt the 2012 season.

2012 Return Missionary Commitments
BYU also announced a large list of return missionaries that would help bolster their roster this season. Commit dates in this section are dates in which it was announced these players would return to BYU, not when they actually first signed with BYU.

2012 Departures
The following Cougars graduated, transferred, or chose to serve two-year Church Missions after the 2011 season and didn't return to the team in 2012.

Spring Game
The BYU 2012 Spring game was held on March 24, 2012. Due to a high number of injuries in spring football, it was downgraded to a scrimmage. All the starters were benched. Each of the remaining 4 quarterbacks got 2 series to play against selected defensive players. The scrimmage would end in a scoreless fashion at 0–0. However Coach Bronco Mendenhall said the game accomplished what he wanted it to. He was able to find a set of players that would be beneficial to the team this fall as starters or backups.

Transfers
Controversy arose with the BYU football team in April 2012 when it was revealed that Michael Wadsworth, a defensive back, had requested a transfer from Hawaiʻi while on his church mission. The reason he gave stated he wanted to play closer to his home in Orem, Utah. Hawaiʻi denied his request and asked him to complete one more season. Despite appeals to the coach, Greg McMackin, and others higher up at the university, Wadsworth was denied his attempt to transfer. When Norm Chow became the new coach of the Warriors, he was contacted by the Wadsworth's about the possible transfer. Chow said Wadsworth could transfer to any school except BYU. Despite being a former offensive coordinator at BYU, Chow claimed it was his belief that BYU had an unfair recruiting advantage with missionaries. Bronco Mendenhall and the staff have made it clear that they don't contact any missionaries in the field for recruiting purposes, and they have not made any contact with the Wadsworth family. At this time Wadsworth plans on go to BYU in the fall, but he won't be able to play football with BYU or even talk to the coaches about possibly playing football with them until June 2013.

On May 2, BYU learned that Colorado State transfer Drew Reilly would come to BYU. Reilly was a starting safety for the Rams 2011 season. Reilly's reasons for transferring were solely to seek a better atmosphere for his LDS beliefs. As is required, Reilly will sit out the 2012 season, but he will become a full scholarship student at BYU in January 2013 and be able to participate in spring ball in April 2013.

Pre-season honors
1 BYU Cougar was selected as a 2012 All-American participant, and 16 BYU Cougars were selected to the Phil-Steele All-Independent team to begin 2012 (Cody Hoffman was selected for two different positions).

Media

2012 Media Day
On the BYU Spring Football Special aired April 2, 2012, it was announced that BYUtv would provide coverage of the national media day, probably sometime in July. On May 7 it was announced that BYU Football National Media Day would take place on Wednesday, June 27, 2012 from the BYU Broadcasting Center.

For football Media Day Dave McCann, Bronco Mendenhall, Tom Holmoe, and Trevor Matich discussed what the Cougars goals were for the 2012 season during the State of the Program discussion. They also discussed the new playoff format that will begin in 2014.

One of the hot topics was the BYU-Utah rivalry and if 2012 would be the last year for this traditional rivalry. Both Holmoe and Mendenhall said they want the rivalry to continue and that it is up in the hands of Utah's board. However, they hoped that with Strength of Schedule being one of the factors in the new playoff system, it should provide extra incentive for Utah to want to continue the rivalry.

Another topic discussed was moving the Utah State- BYU game from conference weekend back to November. Mendenhall said he liked the idea of having a traditional rival as the final game, and with the improvements Gary Andersen continued to make at Utah State, it would be a desirable outcome if both schools could make it happen.

Finally the discussion of realignment and the BYU–Notre Dame alliance was discussed. Holmoe made it clear that Independence is the course that BYU will continue to take at this time, and they thanked Notre Dame football for providing a voice for BYU and Notre Dame in scheduling this new playoff format. He admitted BYU would keep an eye on the continuing changes of the college football landscape, but BYU and Notre Dame will continue to be partners in Independence for the foreseeable future.

The second program on Media Day was a True Blue 2012 Football Season Preview. Brandon Doman, Riley Nelson, Kyle Van Noy, and others were brought in to discuss what the coaches, offensive players, and defensive players are doing to get ready for the 2012 season. They also stated their goals. Bruce Binkowski, the Poinsettia Bowl and Holiday Bowl GM Association Executive Director, attended the show and discussed why the Poinsettia Bowl had signed BYU up for the 2012 season. He also revealed the ideal match for the 2012 Poinsettia Bowl would be BYU vs. San Diego State, a match-up which eventually came to fruition.

The third program held was a round table discussion. It focused on how Bronco Mendenhall has focused on changing the offense and defense at BYU since he became the head coach. John Beck, Curtis Brown, Vic So'oto, Max Hall, Austin Collie, and Dennis Pitta came back to discuss how playing at BYU has prepared them for the NFL, what their favorite moments were at BYU, and how Mendenhall changed the program into the 6th most winning program in NCAA Football during his 7 years at BYU.

Throughout the day Robbie Bullough also had live chats online with current BYU players and coaches.

BYU Radio Sports Network Affiliates

KSL 102.7 FM and 1160 AM- Flagship Station (Salt Lake City/ Provo, UT and ksl.com)BYU Radio- Nationwide (Dish Network 980, Sirius XM 143, and byuradio.org)KIDO- Boise, ID [football only]KTHK- Blackfoot/ Idaho Falls/ Pocatello/ Rexburg, IDKMGR- Manti, UTKSUB- Cedar City, UTKDXU- St. George, UTKSHP- Las Vegas, NV [football only]

Roster

Depth chart

Rankings

Schedule

Game summaries

Washington State

Sources:

BYU alum Mike Leach returned to Provo with a football team for the first time since he got his bachelor's when Washington State came to Provo. Leach didn't play or coach football while at BYU, so it was his first time on the field at LaVell Edwards Stadium. It was the first of a two-year home-and-home series between the schools and the fourth time they had met overall. BYU led the series 2–1.

After the game, Riley Nelson and Kaneakua Friel were announced as Co-Offensive FBS Independent Players of the Week. Riley Stephenson was announced as the Special Teams player of the Week. It was Nelson's fifth FBS Independent Player of the Week award while it was a first for both Stephenson and Friel. BYU's performance in the game led Mark Schlabach and Jesse Palmer to compare Riley Nelson with Tim Tebow while also announcing that BYU's defense was one of the most underrated groups in all of college football.

Weber State

Sources:

For only the third time in the schools histories, BYU and Weber State will meet in a collegiate football game. The series has been rather lopsided in BYU's favor. In the first meeting in 1973 BYU won 45–14. In the second meeting in 1979 BYU again prevailed 48–3. 

Thanks to an average of 53.2 yards per punt, BYU punter Riley Stephenson was named the FBS Independents Special Teams player of the week. Stephenson punted 5 times during the game with a long punt of 61 yards occurring.

Utah

Sources:

The sixth year of the Deseret First Duel returns to Salt Lake City for the 2012 football match-up between BYU and Utah. It's the 88th meeting between the two schools since Brigham Young Academy became BYU. Utah leads the series 52–31–4 and has a current two game winning streak. Utah has a 4–3 record against current coach Bronco Mendenhall. BYU will look to end Utah's winning streak at Rice-Eccles against the Cougs, as the Utes have won 2 straight and 4 of the last 5 at Rice-Eccles.

#24 Boise State

Sources:

The Cougars and Broncos begin the first of a 12-year football series with this 2012 match. Boise State leads the all-time series 2–0, having won previous matches in 2003 and 2004.

Despite the loss, Stephenson was once again awarded the FBS Independents Special Teams Player of the Week award. Stephenson punted 6 times during the game, with an average of 47 yards per punt, but what was impressive were his consistent 50+ yard punts: 52, 55, 56, and 57. On four of the six punts, Boise State had to start the next possession inside their own 20 yard line.

Hawaii

Sources:

Hawaii returns to Provo for the first time since 2002 to continue their rivalry with BYU. It will be the 29th meeting overall, with BYU holding a 20–8 advantage. It will be the first time former BYU offensive coordinator Norm Chow faces his old school as a head coach.

The following Monday QB Taysom Hill was awarded the FBS Independent Offensive Player of the Week award and CB Preston Hadley was awarded the FBS Independent Defensive Player of the Week award.

Utah State

Sources:

BYU looks for their second straight win in the Battle for the Old Wagon Wheel as BYU and Utah State meet for the 82nd time. BYU owns a 44–34–3 record overall against Utah State and a 26–16–1 record in matches in Provo.

#10 Oregon State

Sources:

Bronco Mendenhall meets his alma mater for the second consecutive season and the third time in four years as coach at BYU. The winner of the game will take the lead in the series all time, which is even at 5–5. BYU is 2–1 in meetings in Provo. BYU is looking for their fourth straight win over Oregon State having won games in 1986, 2009, and 2011.

#5 Notre Dame

Sources:

The first of 6 matches between the Cougars and Irish before 2020 begins what most people believe is BYU's hardest road stretch of the year. BYU looks to cut into the 4–2 record Notre Dame has against the Cougars.

Georgia Tech

Sources:

The first game in a 4-game series against Georgia Tech (that is expected to be cut to two games) continues BYU's road stretch in ACC country.  The two schools have met twice before, in a home-and-home series in 2002 and 2003, in which each school prevailed at home.

Idaho

Sources:

BYU finishes their home schedule with the first of 3 consecutive games against the Western Athletic Conference. BYU and Idaho meet for the fifth time with a 2–2 record against each other.

San Jose State

Sources:

BYU begins their final road trip in San Jose to face off with the Spartans and try to cut down the deficit record they have against the Spartans all-time: 6–9.

New Mexico State

Sources:

The Cougars end their regular season with their first trip to Las Cruces for a football game. The Cougars and Aggies meet for the second-straight year with the Cougars owning a 1–0 record in the all-time series.

Poinsettia Bowl

Sources:

References

BYU
BYU Cougars football seasons
Poinsettia Bowl champion seasons
BYU Cougars football